Ira Dance "Pat" Townsend (January 9, 1894 – July 21, 1965) was a Major League Baseball pitcher. He played two seasons with the Boston Braves from 1920 to 1921.

References

External links

Boston Braves players
1894 births
1965 deaths
Baseball players from Texas
People from Weimar, Texas
Major League Baseball pitchers
Toronto Maple Leafs (International League) players
Beaumont Exporters players